Itantsa is a rural locality (a settlement) in Pribaykalsky District, Republic of Buryatia, Russia. The population was 1,022 as of 2010. There are 23 streets.

Geography 
Itantsa is located 12 km southwest of Turuntayevo (the district's administrative centre) by road. Koma is the nearest rural locality.

References 

Rural localities in Okinsky District